Patrice Émery Trovoada (born 18 March 1962) is a São Toméan politician who is the 15th prime minister of São Tomé and Príncipe since November 2022. He previously served as Prime Minister from February 2008 to June 2008, from August 2010 to December 2012 and again from November 2014 to December 2018.

Life and career
Trovoada was born in Libreville, Gabon.  He is the son of  Miguel Trovoada, who was President of São Tomé and Príncipe from 1991 to 2001, and was named after Patrice Lumumba, the first Prime Minister of Congo (Léopoldville). He studied in Portugal and France.

He served as the Minister of Foreign Affairs from September 2001 to 4 February 2002. He was also oil adviser to President Fradique de Menezes until Menezes fired him in May 2005, alleging that Trovoada had used his position to advance his business interests.

Trovoada is Secretary-General of Independent Democratic Action (ADI), a political party. He ran for President in the July 2006 presidential election, but was defeated by Menezes, the incumbent president. Trovoada was the only major opposition candidate and he received 38.82% of the vote.

On 14 February 2008, Trovoada became Prime Minister; he was appointed by Menezes following the resignation of Tomé Vera Cruz.

On 4 March 2008, he made a brief official visit to Gabon.

Trovoada's government was defeated in a censure motion in the National Assembly on 20 May 2008 after three months in office. The motion, introduced by the opposition Movement for the Liberation of São Tomé and Príncipe/Social Democratic Party (MLSTP/PSD), received 30 votes in favor, 23 opposed, and two abstaining. In June, Menezes asked the MLSTP/PSD to form a government, and it chose its leader, Joaquim Rafael Branco, as Prime Minister.

After the 2010 parliamentary election, Trovoada returned as Prime Minister on 14 August 2010, but left office on 13 December 2012, after his government had lost its majority in parliament. However, the parliamentary election of 2014 again produced a majority for Trovoada's Independent Democratic Action party, with 33 of the 55 seats in the National Assembly, and he was again appointed to head a new government.

References

|-

|-

|-

|-

1962 births
Foreign Ministers of São Tomé and Príncipe
Government ministers of São Tomé and Príncipe
Independent Democratic Action politicians
Living people
People from Libreville
Children of national leaders
21st-century São Tomé and Príncipe politicians